Fuyutsuki may refer to:

Kozo Fuyutsuki, an animation character in Neon Genesis Evangelion
Azusa Fuyutsuki, an animation character in Great Teacher Onizuka (GTO)
Japanese destroyer Fuyutsuki, a destroyer of the 1942 Akizuki class of the Imperial Japanese Navy during World War II
JDS Fuyuzuki (DD-118), a destroyer of the 2010 Akizuki class of the Japanese Maritime Self-Defense Force